REX2, RNA exonuclease 2 homolog (S. cerevisiae), also known as REXO2, is an enzyme which in humans is encoded by the REXO2 gene.

Function 

Nucleases are components of DNA and RNA metabolism that carry out functions in DNA repair, replication, and recombination and in RNA processing and degradation. SFN is a homolog of Orn, a 3-prime-to-5-prime exoribonuclease of E. coli that attacks the free 3-prime hydroxyl group on single-stranded RNA, releasing 5-prime mono-nucleotides in a sequential manner.

References

Further reading